Ryu Ui-hyun (born April 15, 1999), a South Korean actor. He gained attention through his roles in web series A-Teen (2018), A-Teen 2 (2019) and Adult Trainee (2021).

Filmography

Film

Television series

Web series

References

External links
 

1999 births
Living people
South Korean male film actors
South Korean male television actors
South Korean male child actors
South Korean male web series actors
Male actors from Seoul
Hanlim Multi Art School alumni